Hedwig Sophia of Brandenburg (14 July 1623, Berlin – 26 June 1683, Schmalkalden) was Landgravine consort of Hesse-Kassel by marriage to William VI, Landgrave of Hesse-Kassel, and regent from 1663 until 1677 during the minority of her sons, William VII, Landgrave of Hesse-Kassel and Charles I, Landgrave of Hesse-Kassel.

Life
She was the daughter of George William, Elector of Brandenburg and Elizabeth Charlotte of the Palatinate. She married William VI, Landgrave of Hesse-Kassel in 1649.

Regency
Upon the death of her spouse in 1663, he was succeeded by their son, William VII, Landgrave of Hesse-Kassel. As his mother and guardian, she became regent. Her regency was terminated upon the death of her son in 1670, but as he was succeeded by her second son, Charles I, Landgrave of Hesse-Kassel, who was also a minor, she was confirmed as such again.

During her regency, she repaired the finances of the state, which had been drained during the Thirty Years' War, by raised taxes. She kept the peace despite French expansionism until 1673, when she allied with her brother in Brandenburg against France.

During her last years as regent, she delayed her mandate to the dislike of her son until she was forced to hand over the regency in 1677.

Ancestry

References 
 Hans Philippi, Die Landgrafschaft Hessen-Kassel 1648–1806 = Veröffentlichungen der Historischen Kommission für Hessen 46 = Kleine Schriften 8, Marburg 2007.

|-

1623 births
1683 deaths
House of Hohenzollern
Landgravines of Hesse-Kassel
17th-century German people
17th-century women rulers
Daughters of monarchs